David Francis St. James (born September 4, 1947) is an American character actor and comedian.

Career 
In 1992, St. James began his acting career with an appearance in the film Man Trouble. St. James is best known for his recurring roles on multiple television series, including iCarly, General Hospital, Beverly Hills, 90210, The Neighbors, Big Love, Monk, Preacher, The West Wing, and Frasier. St. James appears on The West Wing as Congressman Darren Gibson and on iCarly as Mr. Howard, a mean teacher who hates his students and wife. He also appeared in Creative Differences as Dick. He has appeared in nearly 100 movies and has had many roles on television and in commercials. St. James is also known for his role as Admiral Broden in Space: Above and Beyond and Bob Garland in Donnie Darko.

Filmography

References

External links 

David St. James on TV.com
St. James

1947 births
Living people
20th-century American male actors
21st-century American male actors
American male comedians
American male film actors
American male television actors
Comedians from Hawaii
Male actors from Hawaii
Male actors from Honolulu